Puyehue (Mapudungun: Puye (small fish), hue (place)) may refer to:
Puyehue Lake 
Puyehue Volcano
Puyehue National Park
Cardenal Antonio Samoré Pass formerly known as Puyehue Pass
Puyehue, Chile a commune in Osorno Province
Puyehue Hot Springs